Aajtak Tez or Tez News renamed as Good News Today or GNT was 24-hour Hindi reality show channel owned by the TV Today Network, and a sister channel of Aaj Tak. Tez was running between 22 August 2005 and 4 September 2021. The channel has renamed to Good News Today or GNT which came from effect  from 5 September 2021. GNT News TV channel now available on DD Free dish DTH, at channel number 13.

Good News Today 
The Aajtak Tez has been renamed to Good News Today (a.k.a. GNT) which took effect from 5 September 2021 at 7.00PM IST.

See also 

 List of television stations in India

References

External links 
 
 gnttv.com.

India Today Group
Television channels and stations established in 2004
Mass media in Mumbai